Sanford Field was an on-campus playing venue for football and baseball at the University of Georgia (UGA) in Athens, Georgia.  It was built with wooden stands in 1911 and was named after Steadman V. Sanford.  As a venue for football, it was replaced in 1929 by Sanford Stadium, which was built nearby.

Sources

 

American football venues in Georgia (U.S. state)
Defunct college football venues
College baseball venues in the United States
Georgia Bulldogs baseball venues
Georgia Bulldogs football venues
Baseball venues in Georgia (U.S. state)
Buildings and structures in Athens, Georgia
1911 establishments in Georgia (U.S. state)
Sports venues completed in 1911